Pauline Bøgelund (born 17 February 1996) is a Danish handball player who plays for Viborg HK.

International honours
EHF Cup Winners' Cup:
Winner: 2015

References

1996 births
Living people
People from Egedal Municipality
Danish female handball players
FCM Håndbold players
Sportspeople from the Capital Region of Denmark